was a railway station in Nakagawa, Nakagawa District, Hokkaidō, Japan. The station closed on 13 March 2022.

Lines
Hokkaido Railway Company
Sōya Main Line Station W65

Layout
Utanai Station has a single side platform.

Adjacent stations

Stations of Hokkaido Railway Company
Railway stations in Hokkaido Prefecture
Railway stations in Japan opened in 1923
Railway stations closed in 2022